The 2005 ATP Buenos Aires was an Association of Tennis Professionals men's tennis tournament held in Buenos Aires, Argentina. It was the 33rd edition of the event and was part of the International Series of the 2005 ATP Tour. The tournament was played on outdoor clay court and held from 7 February to 14 February 2005. Second-seeded Gastón Gaudio won the singles title.

Finals

Singles

 Gastón Gaudio defeated  Mariano Puerta 6–4, 6–4
 It was Gaudio's 2nd title of the year and the 7th of his career.

Doubles

 František Čermák /  Leoš Friedl defeated  José Acasuso /  Sebastián Prieto 6–2, 7–5
 It was Čermák's 1st title of the year and the 6th of his career. It was Friedl's 1st title of the year and the 6th of his career.

References

External links 
Official website
ATP tournament profile
Singles draw
Doubles draw

 
ATP Buenos Aires
ATP Buenos Aires
February 2005 sports events in South America